is a 2019 Japanese animated film produced by CloverWorks. The film is directed by Tatsuyuki Nagai and written by Mari Okada, with Masayoshi Tanaka designing the characters and serving as chief animation director. The trio under the creative team Super Peace Busters previously worked together on Anohana: The Flower We Saw That Day, The Anthem of the Heart, and Toradora!. It was released in Japan on October 11, 2019 in all Toho Cinemas.

Synopsis 
In Chichibu, third-year high school student Akane Aioi is dating Shinnosuke Kanamuro (nicknamed Shinno), an aspiring guitarist. Shinno is also friendly with Akane's preschooler sister Aoi, and in turn the sisters support Shinno's band. Akane and Shinno plan to move to Tokyo after graduation, where Shinno will pursue a career in music. However, the girls' parents are killed in a car accident and Akane changes her plans, choosing to stay in Chichibu to raise Aoi.

Thirteen years later, Aoi is an aspiring bassist who plans to move to Tokyo after high school, while Akane works for the city hall. Masamichi Nakamura (nicknamed Michinko), the drummer of Shinno's former band, also works for the city hall. Michinko is planning to hold a music festival to boost the city's tourism, and the main performer is the famous enka singer Dankichi Nitobe.

One afternoon, while practicing bass alone in the hall, Aoi encounters Shinno from thirteen years ago. Frightened, she runs home to Akane and awkwardly asks her about Shinno. Akane admits that she has not heard from Shinno since he left, and is not even sure if he is still alive. This leads Aoi to believe she had seen Shinno's ghost. Later, the sisters reluctantly help Michinko in welcoming Dankichi Nitobe, and they are surprised to see a grown Shinnosuke as the guitarist of Nitobe's backup band. Aoi then returns to the hall with her friend Tsugu (Michinko's son), where they confirm that the young Shinno has a physical body but is unable to leave the hall. Tsugu hypothesizes that Shinno is an ikiryō (living ghost) born from Shinnosuke's strong unresolved feelings. Shinno then asks Aoi to help bring Akane and Shinnosuke together, believing that doing so will return him to Shinnosuke's body. However, this proves to be difficult as Shinnosuke is rude, arrogant, and does not get along with the Aioi sisters—a different person from the Shinno that they once knew.

Characters 

A 16-year-old second-year high school student. She is an aspiring musician who was influenced by Shinno. She grows up thinking that Akane did not go to Tokyo with Shinno because of her.
 

Aoi's 30-year-old reserved older sister who has been supporting both of them after the death of their parents. She is called  by Aoi.
 

He is Akane's ex-boyfriend and struggling guitarist. An ikiryō (living ghost) of his younger self appears.

A famous enka singer.

A 10-year-old fifth grader and Masamichi's only son.

A former drummer in Shinnosuke's band, and high school classmate of Akane and Shinnosuke. He divorced his cheating wife and has a crush on Akane.

A classmate of Aoi. She dreams of getting a boyfriend who is in a band.

Production 
Her Blue Sky was announced by the Super Peace Busters creative team on March 21, 2019, consisting of director Tatsuyuki Nagai, screenwriter Mari Okada, and character designer Masayoshi Tanaka. The trio previously collaborated on Toradora, Anohana: The Flower We Saw That Day, and The Anthem of the Heart, with the film set in Chichibu, Saitama, Okada's hometown and the setting of the two latter aforementioned anime, focusing on the relationship between four individuals. The film is animated by CloverWorks, directed by Nagai and written by Okada, with Tanaka serving as character designer and chief animation director. Masaru Yokoyama is composing the film's soundtrack. Aniplex, Fuji TV, Toho and STORY are credited for production.

The theme song titled after the film, as well as the ending theme song  are performed by Aimyon.

Release 
The film was distributed by Toho and it was released in Japan on October 11, 2019 in all Toho Cinemas in Japan.

Reception

Box office 
Her Blue Sky in its opening weekend ranked #4 in the Japanese box office, earning  in 3 days.

The film was released on DVD and Blu-ray in Japan on June 10, 2020.

Other media 
Two novels and three manga volumes were released.

Novels 
One of the novels was released in two different forms:
  by Mio Nukaga (August 2019, Kadokawa, based on the screenplay)
  by Mio Nukaga (August 2019, Kadokawa, same novel as above, but with furigana and illustrated by Ryō Akizuki)

The second novel was a spinoff told from the perspectives of other characters in the story:
  by Saginomiya Misaki (October 2019, Kadokawa)

Manga 
A three-volume manga series by Yaeko Ninagawa was released between 2019 and 2020 by Kadokawa Corporation after being serialized on their Comic Newtype website.
 Volume 1 (October 2019)
 Volume 2 (April 2020)
 Volume 3 (September 2020)

Notes and references

External links 
  
 
 

2019 anime films
2019 films
2019 romantic drama films
2010s teen films
2010s teen drama films
2010s teen romance films
Animated films about sisters
Anime with original screenplays
Aniplex
CloverWorks
Films set in 2006
Films set in 2018
Films set in Saitama Prefecture
Films with screenplays by Mari Okada
Japanese high school films
Japanese romance films
Japanese teen drama films
Midlife crisis films
Noitamina
Toho animated films
Shōnen manga